In economic theory a frictionless market is a financial market without transaction costs.  Friction is a type of market incompleteness.  Every complete market is frictionless, but the converse does not hold.  In a frictionless market the solvency cone is the halfspace normal to the unique price vector.  The Black–Scholes model assumes a frictionless market.

References

Financial markets
Mathematical finance